Proprioseiopsis exopodalis is a species of mite in the family Phytoseiidae.

References

exopodalis
Articles created by Qbugbot
Animals described in 1958